Édouard Karemera (1 September 1951 – 31 August 2020) was a Rwandan politician who was also a convict for Genocide in 1998 and in 2011 he was apprehended.

Born in Mwendo commune, Kibuye préfecture, Rwanda, Karemera held the position of Minister of Institutional Relations in the government of Juvénal Habyarimana of May 1987.

After Habyarimana's assassination, he became Minister of the Interior in the interim government of Jean Kambanda until mid-July 1994. During 1994 he was also First Vice President of the MRND party.

Karemera fled Rwanda after the genocide. On 5 June 1998, he was arrested at his home in Lomé, Togo. His initial trial before the International Criminal Tribunal for Rwanda was suspended after the judge Andresia Vaz resigned because she had lived with a prosecutor.  His new trial began on 19 September 2005. He was accused along with the rest of the prisoners and tried together with Matthieu Ngirumpatse, the President of the MRND, and sentenced to imprisonment on 21 December 2011, at the age of 62, for his role in the genocide. He appealed the verdict, although the sentence of life imprisonment was confirmed on 29 September 2014. Karemera died on 31 August 2020 in Sebikotane prison outside Dakar, Senegal.

Karemera passed away at the age of 69 in prison during the covid-19 pandemic.

See also 
 Augustin Bizimana

References 

1951 births
2020 deaths
Government ministers of Rwanda
Hutu people
National Republican Movement for Democracy and Development politicians
People indicted by the International Criminal Tribunal for Rwanda
Rwandan exiles
Interior ministers of Rwanda